Mohla Langrial is a village situated near University of Gujrat in the district of Gujrat, Pakistan.

References

Villages in Gujrat District